Garstang is an ancient market town and civil parish within the Wyre borough of Lancashire, England.

In 2011, the parish had a total resident population of 4,268; the larger Garstang Built-up Area, which includes the adjoining settlements of Bonds and Cabus, had population of 6,779. Garstang is famous for being the world's first ever Fairtrade Town.

Etymology
Garstang is mentioned in the Domesday Book of 1086 as Cherestanc. Later recordings of the name include Geresteng, Gairstang in 1195; Grestein, 1204; Gayrestan, 1236; Gayerstang, 1246; Gayrstang, 1274; Gayrestang, 1292.

The original spelling of Garstang has several interpretations: "'gore by the boundary pole", "spear post", "triangular piece of land", "common land" or "meadowland". Possibly signifying the site of a meeting-space. The Old Norse derivation being 'geiri', a gore, from 'geirr', with 'stang' or 'stong', meaning "pole" or "boundary marker".  Or the Saxon derivation 'Gaerstung'. It is probable that the historic market cross is this same site.

History

Early history

A brief but comprehensive history of the parish, including the parish church of St Helen in Churchtown and Greenhalgh Castle, can be found in "The Parish of Garstang", A History of the County of Lancaster: Volume 7. St. John Plessington was born at Dimples Hall, which is just outside the town.

Garstang was once served by Garstang and Catterall railway station which closed in 1969, and Garstang Town railway station which closed to passengers in 1930.

The town is overlooked by the ruined remains of Greenhalgh Castle, built in 1490 by Thomas Stanley, 1st Earl of Derby. Garstang Town Hall was completed in 1764.

Modern history

Garstang's traditional market day on Thursdays dates back to the early-1300s and stretches the length of street. The Market Cross at the top of the High Street is one of the most familiar landmarks in the area.

The town celebrates an arts festival and an agricultural show (which has been continued for 200 years) every year in August.

In April 2000, Garstang declared itself "the world's first Fairtrade Town", influencing many other towns, cities and counties around the United Kingdom to work towards the same goal. The Fairtrade Town status was renewed by the Fairtrade Foundation on 13 August 2003.

In 2011, a  wind turbine, the UK's largest, was built in the town to provide power for Dewlay; a local factory producing the award-winning Garstang Blue cheese.

The local newspaper, the Garstang Courier, is available on tape free of charge to blind and partially-sighted people from Galloway's Society for the Blind.

Following success in winning the Small Country Town category in the 2002 Britain in Bloom Awards, Garstang won the Small Town category in the 2005, 2006 and 2010 and was invited to the champion of champions in 2010 also.

Local primary schools are Garstang Community Primary School, Garstang St Thomas Church of England School and SS Mary and Michael Catholic School. The local secondary school is Garstang Community Academy which does not offer sixth form courses; pupils have to travel to Lancaster, Preston or Blackpool and further to sit A-Level courses.

The town has seven public houses: The Farmers Arms, the Crown, the Eagle and Child, the King's Arms, the Royal Oak Hotel, the Wheatsheaf, Th'Owd Tithe Barn, with the Bellflower (formerly the Flag) in Nateby and Crofters Tavern in Cabus. It has three restaurants: Pipers, Ken Ma and the Great Season, the latter two being Chinese restaurants. There is also a golf club and Country Hotel and the Crofter's Hotel, on the main A6 road.

Garstang is referenced in episode 5 of the first series of the comedy Phoenix Nights. Brian Potter (played by Peter Kay) said "What have you called us? What have you called the best cabaret lounge this side of Garstang?" in reference to an alternative comedy night being run at his fictional club.

The town is served by the Anglican church of St Thomas and the Catholic church of St Mary and St Michael (just outside the town's boundaries in Bonds).

Governance 
From a very early time, Garstang lay within the Amounderness Hundred of Lancashire. From 1894 until 1974 Garstang formed its own local government district in the administrative county of Lancashire; "Garstang Rural District", which extended beyond the current civil parish boundaries, including villages such as Pilling.

Since 1974, Garstang has formed part of the Wyre borough of Lancashire, although it retains an elected Town Council with limited jurisdiction. The borough ward has three councillors, including Lady Dulcie Atkins, wife of former MEP Sir Robert Atkins.

The population of the ward at the 2011 Census was 4,852.

Geography
Lying on the River Wyre, River Calder and the Lancaster Canal, Garstang is situated close to the A6 road, the M6 motorway, and the West Coast Main Line, between Lancaster and Preston. It lies on the eastern edge of the Fylde, and the Forest of Bowland is not far to the east.

Garstang and the nearby villages of Bonds, Bowgreave, Catterall and Western Claughton-On-Brock form an almost continuous built-up area, bypassed by the A6 road in 1928 (incorrectly given as 1926 in). Other nearby villages not bypassed by the A6 road include: Brock, Bilsborrow, Cabus and Churchtown form another, much larger, continuous built-up area which includes Garstang in the centre.

Sport
Garstang F.C. are a non-league football club and the local team within the village. Founded in 1885, they play in the North West Counties League, having won the West Lanchashire League Premier League and Richardson Cup double in 2018.

People
The following people have lived, or were born, in Garstang:

 Isaac Ambrose (1604–1664), a Puritan vicar
 Sir Robert Atkins, Member of the European Parliament for the North West England region and Vice-President of Lancashire County Cricket Club
 Dicky Bond (1883–1955), footballer noted for his time at Preston North End and Bradford City
 Harry Dean (1884–1957), Lancashire cricketer who played three Test matches for England
 George Benson (1893–1974), a footballer noted for his time at Accrington Stanley
 Mary Anne Hobbs (1964–), a BBC Radio 6 Music disc jockey
 Adam Phillips, footballer
 Jason Robinson (1974–), an England rugby player (both league and union) 
 Robert Terrill Rundle (1811–1896), a Methodist missionary noted for his work in Western Canada
 Rt Revd Paul Swarbrick (born 1958), Roman Catholic bishop
 John Woolrich (1954–), composer, lived in Garstang from 1955 to 1972

See also

 Listed buildings in Garstang
 Garstang F.C.

References

External links 
 Official Garstang website Garstang website operated by Garstang and District Chamber of Trade and Commerce.
 Independent Garstang website Garstang information and entertainment site.
 Garstang website Garstang Town Council website.
 Garstang, GENUKI article.
 Garstang Fair Trade Town

 
Towns in Lancashire
Market towns in Lancashire
Civil parishes in Lancashire
Geography of the Borough of Wyre